Thomas Weldon Shrewsbury (born 18 January 1995 in Southampton, Hampshire) is an English cricket player. Shrewsbury is a right-arm off spin bowler who bats right-handed. Shrewsbury made his first-class debut for Gloucestershire on 2 August 2013 against Northamptonshire.

References

External links
 

Living people
1995 births
English cricketers
Gloucestershire cricketers
Cornwall cricketers

Cricketers from Southampton
English cricketers of the 21st century